is an album which recorded a so-called " session" between Jazz fusion musicians and Japanese rock musicians, led by Ryuichi Sakamoto at the time of the formation of Yellow Magic Orchestra.
" session" of this album is regarded as a prototype of Kazumi Watanabe's "Kylyn session".

Background
Although CBS Sony proposed an original plan of one Bossanova album, Sakamoto didn't accept it and conversely proposed to challenge Reggae, and this album was created as the achievement.

Track listing

Personnel
Producer, Arranged By – Ryuichi Sakamoto
Keyboards – Ryuichi Sakamoto
Backing Vocals – Eve (track: 2),  Akiko Yano (track: 3), Tatsuro Yamashita (tracks: 5 and 7),  (track: 7)
Saxophone – Mabumi Yamaguchi (tracks: 1)
Guitar – Kazumi Watanabe as Abdullah The "Busher" (tracks: 3, 7), Kenji Omura (tracks: 3, 7),  (tracks: 4, 5), Shigeru Suzuki (tracks: 1, 2, 4, 6)
Bass – Ray Ohara (tracks: 1 to 4, 6, 7)
Drums – Yukihiro Takahashi
Percussion – Motoya Hamaguchi (tracks: 1, 2, 4, 6), Pecker (tracks: 3, 5, 7)
Engineer – Yuichi Maejima*
Associate Engineer – Mikio Takamatsu
Recording Co-ordinator – Akira Ikuta
Mastered By – Eiji Taniguchi
Director – Shinichi Hashimoto
Design – Mitsuru Yamada
Illustration – Shigenari Ohnishi
Photography By – Youhei Nagasaka

References

1979 albums
Ryuichi Sakamoto albums
Sony Music Entertainment Japan albums
Albums produced by Ryuichi Sakamoto